Frederick William Dallinger (October 2, 1871 – September 5, 1955) was a United States representative from Massachusetts and a judge of the United States Customs Court.

Education and career

Born on October 2, 1871, in Cambridge, Middlesex County, Massachusetts, Dallinger attended the common schools and graduated from Cambridge Latin School in 1889. He received an Artium Baccalaureus degree in 1893 from Harvard University, an Artium Magister degree in 1894 from the same institution and a Bachelor of Laws in 1897 from Harvard Law School and was admitted to the bar the same year. He was a member of the Massachusetts House of Representatives from 1894 to 1895 and a member of the Massachusetts Senate from 1896 to 1899. He was in private practice in Boston, Massachusetts from 1897 to 1932. He was a public administrator for Middlesex County, Massachusetts from 1897 to 1932. He was President of the Cambridge Chamber of Commerce. He was a lecturer for Harvard Law School in 1912.

Congressional service

Dallinger was elected as a Republican to the United States House of Representatives of the 64th United States Congress and to the four succeeding Congresses, serving from March 4, 1915 to March 3, 1925. He was Chairman of the Committee on Elections No. 1 in the 66th and 67th United States Congresses and the Committee on Education in the 68th United States Congress. He was not a candidate for renomination in 1924, but was an unsuccessful candidate for the Republican nomination for United States Senator. He was subsequently elected to the 69th United States Congress to fill the vacancy caused by the death of his successor, United States Representative Harry Irving Thayer. He was reelected to the 70th, 71st and 72nd United States Congresses and served from November 2, 1926, until his resignation effective October 1, 1932, having been appointed to the federal bench.

Federal judicial service

Dallinger was nominated by President Herbert Hoover on June 20, 1932, to a seat on the United States Customs Court vacated by Judge Israel F. Fischer. He was confirmed by the United States Senate on June 28, 1932, and received his commission on July 8, 1932. His service terminated on October 31, 1942, due to his retirement. He was succeeded by Judge Charles Drummond Lawrence.

Later years and death

After his retirement from the federal bench, Dallinger engaged in agricultural pursuits. He later retired and resided in Center Lovell, Maine. He died on September 5, 1955, in North Conway, New Hampshire. He was interred in Center Lovell Cemetery in Center Lovell.

See also
 119th Massachusetts General Court (1898)

References

Sources

External links
 

1871 births
1955 deaths
Republican Party members of the Massachusetts House of Representatives
Republican Party Massachusetts state senators
Harvard Law School alumni
Judges of the United States Customs Court
Politicians from Cambridge, Massachusetts
United States Article I federal judges appointed by Herbert Hoover
20th-century American judges
Republican Party members of the United States House of Representatives from Massachusetts
Lawyers from Cambridge, Massachusetts
People from Lovell, Maine
Cambridge Rindge and Latin School alumni
Harvard College alumni